Quinn Methodist Church is a historic church at the junction of Elm and Main Streets in Quinn, South Dakota. The Methodist church was built from 1908 to 1909 and the inside remodeled in 1961. As one of two churches in the small community, (the other being Roman Catholic) it also housed Lutheran services and a school.

The building was added to the National Register of Historic Places in 2007 and now serves as the Quinn Community Center.

References

Churches on the National Register of Historic Places in South Dakota
Churches in Pennington County, South Dakota
Methodist churches in South Dakota
National Register of Historic Places in Pennington County, South Dakota